The football (soccer) Campeonato Brasileiro Série B 1992, the second level of Brazilian National League, was played from February 9 to July 11, 1992. The competition had 32 clubs and twelve of them were promoted to Série A. The competition was won by Paraná.

First phase

Group 1

Group 2

Group 3

Group 4

Second phase
Originally, the 2nd phase would be disputed in knockout style. The teams would be matched according to their record in the first phase, so the matches would be:

However, to reduce the costs, the 2nd phase was changed and the teams were assigned in groups according to their geographical position. To compensate, clubs with advantage in original rules (Santa Cruz, Criciúma, Ceará, Remo, América and Paraná) earned an extra point.

Group 1

Group 2

Group 3

Third phase
Once more, the rules were changed. For unknown reasons, Fortaleza went to court claiming to have the right to have a berth.  Instead of 6 teams qualifying to the 3rd phase, 2 more berths were created. CBF invited Fortaleza and Grêmio, that had the best record among the eliminated. Grêmio forfeited their berth to the 3rd phase alleging financial reasons, União São João won the berth.

Group 1

Group 2

Semifinals

Finals

First leg

Second leg

Sources

Campeonato Brasileiro Série B seasons
1992 in Brazilian football leagues